Koehneria is a monotypic genus of flowering plants belonging to the family Lythraceae. The only species is Koehneria madagascariensis 

It is native to Madagascar.

The genus name of Koehneria is in honour of Bernhard Adalbert Emil Koehne (1848–1918), a German botanist and dendrologist born near Striegau, a town known today as Strzegom, Poland, 
The Latin specific epithet of madagascariensis means "coming from Madagascar",
and both genus and species were first described and published in Ann. Missouri Bot. Gard. Vol.73 on pages 805-806 in (1986 publ. 1987).

References

Lythraceae
Lythraceae genera
Monotypic Myrtales genera
Plants described in 1845
Endemic flora of Madagascar